is a 12-episode Japanese TV series released in 2008 starring Ai Takabe.

Plot
A teacher, who is not happy with her job, pretends to be the ghost of a murder victim. Little did she know that she would meet the real ghost, the actual murderer and a heroine. She finds a man who chases her.

Casts
Main
 Ai Takabe as Fumiyo Nabekura
 Gaku Shindo as Kogorō Kenzuka
 Yuko Takayama as Miyuki Nakagawa
 Nana Natsume as Rumi Ozaki

Guest
 Ryo Fukawa (Episode 1)
 Minami Minegishi (Episode 5)
 Hanawa (Episode 6)

References

External links
  
 

Japanese drama television series
2008 in Japanese television
2008 Japanese television series debuts
2008 Japanese television series endings
TV Tokyo original programming
Television shows based on Japanese novels